The World Trade Institute (WTI) is an interdisciplinary centre at the University of Bern focused on research, education, and policy support in the areas of global economic governance, international economic law, and international economic sustainability.

Overview
The institute was founded in 1999 as an inter-university centre of the University of Bern, the University of Fribourg, and the University of Neuchâtel.  Since 2009, the WTI is one of the strategic “Centres of Excellence” within the University of Bern, with a global profile in both research and education.  The Swiss National Science Foundation (SNSF) played an important role in the transformation of the WTI into a Swiss university centre of excellence through the SNSF funded National Competence Centre for Research (NCCR) on global economic governance.  Other NCCR-based centers at the University of Bern include NCCR PlanetS (focused on exoplanet studies), NCCR Climate (now the Oeschger Centre for Climate Change Research), and NCCR RNA and Disease. Together with the European University Institute (EUI), the WTI organizes the annual World Trade Forum.

Its research and impact assessments on the negotiation, structure, enforcement, and effects of international economic agreements feature in public policy debates. Notable faculty include Manfred Elsig, Joseph Francois, Peter Van den Bossche, and Thomas Cottier.

Academics

Degrees earned at the WTI are awarded by the University of Bern, and are regulated under Swiss law governing higher education. Degree programs include a PhD program (offered through the Graduate School of Economic Globalisation and Integration), a combined LL.M. and DAS program in International Trade and Investment Law and Economics, an MAS program in international trade regulation (Master of International Law and Economics or MILE), and certificate and diploma programs in international law and economics. Alumni work for a mix of public sector organisations (international organisations, diplomatic services, trade and economics ministries), non-governmental organisations, universities, and the private sector (law firms and industry).

References

University of Bern
Research institutes in Switzerland
1999 establishments in Switzerland
Research institutes established in 1999
Schools of international relations
Economic research institutes
International research institutes